Magra (Spanish for "Slim") is an unincorporated community in Placer County, California. It lies at an elevation of 2887 feet (880 m).

References

Unincorporated communities in California
Unincorporated communities in Placer County, California